The 2019 China Tour was the second season of the China Tour to carry Official World Golf Ranking points. The season consisted of 12 events, two of which were co-sanctioned by the Challenge Tour. The tour was organised by the China Golf Association and ran separately from the 2019 PGA Tour China.

Schedule
The following table lists official events during the 2019 season.

Order of Merit
The Order of Merit was based on prize money won during the season, calculated in Renminbi. The leading player on the tour (not otherwise exempt) earned status to play on the 2020 European Tour.

Notes

References

External links

2019 in golf
2019 in Chinese sport